Stauff is a German surname. Notable people with the surname include:

 Andreas Stauff (born 1987), German professional road bicycle racer
 Philipp Stauff (1876–1923), German/Austrian journalist and publisher, member of the Thule Society
 Werner Stauff (born 1960), German cyclist

German-language surnames